Whewellite  is a mineral, hydrated calcium oxalate, formula Ca C2O4·H2O. Because of its organic content it is thought to have an indirect biological origin; this hypothesis is supported by its presence in coal and sedimentary nodules. However, it has also been found in hydrothermal deposits where a biological source appears improbable. For this reason, it may be classed as a true mineral.

Whewellite, or at least crystalline calcium oxalate, does also arise from biological sources.  Small crystals or flakes of it are sometimes found on the surfaces of some cacti, and kidney stones frequently have the same composition.

Whewellite was named after William Whewell (1794–1866), an English polymath, naturalist and scientist, professor of moral philosophy at Cambridge and inventor of the system of crystallographic indexing.

Heat decomposition

Whewellite is used as a thermogravimetric analysis standard due to its well-known decomposition temperatures and products.

See also 
 List of minerals recognized by the International Mineralogical Association
 List of minerals named after people

References

Bibliography
Palache, P.; Berman H.; Frondel, C. (1960). "Dana's System of Mineralogy, Volume II: Halides, Nitrates, Borates, Carbonates, Sulfates, Phosphates, Arsenates, Tungstates, Molybdates, Etc. (Seventh Edition)" John Wiley and Sons, Inc., New York, pp. 1099-1101.

Calcium minerals
Oxalate minerals
Monoclinic minerals
Minerals in space group 14
Minerals described in 1840